Jenny Gabrielle is an American actress. She appeared in more than forty films since 2001.

Selected filmography

References

External links 

Living people
American film actresses
Year of birth missing (living people)
21st-century American women